Shuford House, also known as Maple Grove, is a historic home located at Hickory, Catawba County, North Carolina. It was built in 1875, and is a two-story, three bay frame dwelling with a central hall plan.  It features a two-story porch supported by four pairs of pillars.

It was listed on the National Register of Historic Places in 1973.

Maple Grove has been restored by the Hickory Landmarks Society and operated as a late 19th-century historic house museum.

References

External links
 Maple Grove - Hickory Landmarks Society

Hickory, North Carolina
Houses on the National Register of Historic Places in North Carolina
Houses completed in 1875
Houses in Catawba County, North Carolina
National Register of Historic Places in Catawba County, North Carolina
Museums in Catawba County, North Carolina
Historic house museums in North Carolina